Beaver Creek is a tributary of Buttermilk Creek in Lackawanna County and Wyoming County, in Pennsylvania, in the United States. The creek is not designated as an impaired waterbody. The surficial geology in its vicinity consists of alluvium, Wisconsinan Till, Wisconsinan Outwash, alluvial fan, Wisconsinan Ice-Contact Stratified Drift, Wisconsinan Bouldery Till, wetlands, and peat bogs.

Course
Beaver Creek begins in a wetland in West Abington Township, Lackawanna County. It flows southwest for a few tenths of a mile, receiving a very short unnamed tributary from the right along the way, and passes through a lake before turning northwest. Several tenths of a mile further downstream, the creek receives another unnamed tributary from the right and turns southwest, passing through a wetland and entering Overfield Township, Wyoming County. In this township, the creek continues flowing southwest, passing through more wetlands and receiving an unnamed tributary from the right. It continues flowing in a generally southwesterly direction along the border between Overfield Township and Falls Township for some distance, receiving two more unnamed tributaries from the right. It then turns south for several tenths of a mile and reaches its confluence with Buttermilk Creek.

Hydrology
Beaver Creek is not designated as an impaired waterbody.

Geography and geology

The surficial geology along the lower reaches of Beaver Creek mainly consists of alluvium, although Wisconsinan Till also occurs in the area. There are also a few small patches of Wisconsinan Outwash and alluvial fan. Further upstream, alluvium and Wisconsinan Till are also prevalent. However, there is also a patch of Wisconsinan Ice-Contact Stratified Drift, another patch of Wisconsinan Bouldery Till, and a few patches of wetlands and peat bogs.

Watershed
The mouth of the creek is in the United States Geological Survey quadrangle of Ransom. However, its source is in the quadrangle of Factoryville.

A dam known as the Winola Mill Pond Dam is in the watershed of Beaver Creek, on one of its tributaries. Lake Winola itself is on a tributary of the creek.

History
Beaver Creek was entered into the Geographic Names Information System on August 2, 1979. Its identifier in the Geographic Names Information System is 1198387.

A concrete tee beam bridge was constructed across Beaver Creek in 1924.

See also
Falls Creek (Buttermilk Creek), next tributary of Buttermilk Creek going downstream
List of rivers of Pennsylvania

References

Rivers of Wyoming County, Pennsylvania
Tributaries of the Susquehanna River
Rivers of Pennsylvania